Johannes Pharamond Rhumelius (1597–1661) was a German alchemist and physician, and a contemporary of Jan Baptist van Helmont. He was born in Neumark and died in Nuremberg.

He is chiefly notable for his works on alchemical medicine, Opuscula Chemico-Magico-Medica (Noremburgse, 1635), Medicina Spagyrica Tripartita (1648), the Compendium Hermeticum (1635) and the Compendium fortificatorium (1632).

His Spagyric Medicine also appeared in German translation as Medicina Spagyrica oder spagyrische Artzneykunst (Frankfurt, 1662), and in a French edition: Médecine spagyrique (1648).

He is described as the son of the doctor John Conrad Rhumelius, a Catholic, a "discípulo de Paracelso," and he also wrote under the pseudonym of "Solomon Raphael."

See also
Paracelsus
Robert Fludd
Jan Baptist van Helmont

Bibliography
Allen G. Debus, The Chemical Philosophy, Dover Publications, 2003, pp. 453–4
Lynn Thorndike, A History of Magic and Experimental Science, part 12, 1923, pp. 192–4

References

1597 births
1661 deaths
17th-century German physicians
Christian Kabbalists
German alchemists
German occultists
Hermeticists
17th-century German writers
17th-century German male writers
17th-century alchemists